The genus Sargassum contains over 300 species of brown algae:

A

Sargassum abbottiae G.C.Trono, Jr., 1994
Sargassum acinacifolium Setchell & N.L.Gardner, 1924
Sargassum acinaciforme Montagne, 1850
Sargassum acinaria C.Agardh, 1821
Sargassum acinarium (Linnaeus) Setchell, 1933
Sargassum agardhianum Farlow, 1889
Sargassum agaviforme Tseng & Lu, 1994
Sargassum albemarlense W.R.Taylor, 1945
Sargassum albertisii Piccone, 1884
Sargassum alternato-pinnatum Yamada, 1942
Sargassum amabile Yamada, 1942
Sargassum amaliae Grunow, 1874
Sargassum ammophilum Yoshida & T.Konno, 1982
Sargassum angii L.M.Laio, 1998
Sargassum angustifolioides Tseng & Lu, 2004
Sargassum angustifolium C.Agardh, 1820
Sargassum aquifolium (Turner) C.Agardh, 1820
Sargassum araii Yoshida, 1994
Sargassum armatum J.Agardh, 1848
Sargassum arnaudianum Montagne, 1850
Sargassum asperifolium Hering & G.Martens ex J.Agardh, 1848
Sargassum assimile Harvey, 1860
Sargassum autumnale Yoshida, 1983

B

Sargassum baccularia (Mertens) C.Agardh, 1824
Sargassum balingasayense Trono, 1994
Sargassum banyuejiaoense C.K.Tseng & Lu, 1996
Sargassum bataanense G.C.Trono, 1994
Sargassum beihaiense C.K.Tseng & B.Lu, 1999
Sargassum belangeri Bory de Saint-Vincent, 1834
Sargassum bermudense Grunow, 1916
Sargassum bicorne J.Agardh, 1848
Sargassum biserrulioides C.K.Tseng & Lu Baroen, 2002
Sargassum boreale Yoshida & Horiguchi, 2000
Sargassum botruosum Montagne, 1850
Sargassum botuliforme Kraft, 2009
Sargassum boveanum J.Agardh, 1848
Sargassum brachycarpum J.Agardh, 1889
Sargassum brachyphyllum Zanardini, 1874
Sargassum brandegeei Setchell & N.L.Gardner, 1924
Sargassum bulbiferum Yoshida, 1994
Sargassum buxifolium (Chauvin) M.J.Wynne, 2011

C

Sargassum calophyllum De Notaris, 1858
Sargassum capillare Kützing, 1843
Sargassum capilliforme Tseng & Lu, 1994
Sargassum capitatum Tseng & Lu, 2002
Sargassum carpophyllum J.Agardh, 1848
Sargassum cavernulosum Kraft, 2009
Sargassum cervicorne Greville, 1849
Sargassum chamissonis Kützing
Sargassum cinctum J.Agardh, 1848
Sargassum cinereum J.Agardh, 1848
Sargassum cinotum J.Agardh
Sargassum claviferum J.Agardh, 1889
Sargassum clonocarpum Grunow, 1889
Sargassum concinnum Greville ex J.Agardh, 1848
Sargassum confusum C.Agardh, 1824
Sargassum congkinhii Pham-Hoàng Hô, 1967
Sargassum corderoi R.B.Modelo Jr, I.Umezaki & L.M.Liao, 1998
Sargassum coreanum J.Agardh, 1889
Sargassum cornigerum Sonder, 1915
Sargassum cornutifructum H.D.Nguyen & Q.N.Huynh, 1999
Sargassum costatum Tseng & Lu, 1996
Sargassum cotoense Nguyen Huu Dai, 2002
Sargassum crispifolium Yamada, 1931
Sargassum cuneifolium J.Agardh, 1837
Sargassum currimaoense G.C.Trono, 1994
Sargassum cylindrocarpum Setchell & Gardner, 1924
Sargassum cylindrocystum Figari & De Notaris, 1853
Sargassum cymosum C.Agardh, 1820
Sargassum cystocarpum C.Agardh, 1820
Sargassum cystophyllum Montagne, 1842

D

Sargassum dasyphyllum
Sargassum dazhouense Tseng & Lu, 1997
Sargassum decaisnei J.Agardh, 1848
Sargassum densicystum Tseng & Lu, 1996
Sargassum densifolium Zanardini, 1858
Sargassum denticarpum T.Ajisaka, 1994
Sargassum dentifolium (Turner) C.Agardh, 1820
Sargassum desfontainesii (Turner) C.Agardh, 1820
Sargassum desvauxii (Mertens) C.Agardh, 1820
Sargassum distichum Sonder, 1845
Sargassum divaricatum Greville, 1849
Sargassum diversifolium (Turner) C.Agardh, 1824
Sargassum dotyi Trono, 1994
Sargassum dumosum Greville, 1848

E

Sargassum ecuadoreanum W.R.Taylor, 1945
Sargassum elegans Suhr, 1840
Sargassum emarginatum C.K.Tseng & Lu, 1978
Sargassum ensifolium (C.Agardh) J.Agardh, 1873
Sargassum erinaceum Greville ex Kuntze, 1880
Sargassum erosum J.Agardh, 1889
Sargassum erumpens Tseng & Lu, 1996
Sargassum esperi C.Agardh, 1820
Sargassum expansum Kuntze, 1880

F

Sargassum fallax Sonder, 1845
Sargassum feldmannii Pham-Hoàng Hô, 1967
Sargassum fergusonii Grunow, 1915
Sargassum filifolium (C.Agardh) C.Agardh, 1824
Sargassum filiforme Montagne, 1844
Sargassum filipendula C.Agardh, 1824
Sargassum fissifolium (Mertens) C.Agardh, 1823
Sargassum flavicans (Mertens) C.Agardh, 1820
Sargassum flavifolium Kützing, 1849
Sargassum fluitans (Børgesen) Børgesen, 1914
Sargassum fragile J.Agardh, 1889
Sargassum fresenianum J.Agardh, 1837
Sargassum frutescens Tseng & Lu, 1994
Sargassum fruticulosum Tseng & Lu, 1994
Sargassum fujianense C.K.Tseng & B.Lu, 2002
Sargassum fuliginosoides Tseng & Lu, 2000
Sargassum fulvellum (Turner) C.Agardh, 1820
Sargassum furcatum Kützing, 1843
Sargassum fuscifolium Tseng & Lu, 2002
Sargassum fusiforme (Harvey) Setchell, 1931

G

Sargassum galapagense Grunow, 1886
Sargassum gemmiphorum Tseng & Lu, 2000
Sargassum giganteifolium Yamada, 1925
Sargassum giganteum O.Camacho & G.Diaz-Pulido, 2014
Sargassum glandulifolium Grunow, 1900
Sargassum glaucescens J.Agardh, 1848
Sargassum globulariifolium J.Agardh, 1889
Sargassum godeffroyi Grunow, 1874
Sargassum gracillimum Reinbold, 1913
Sargassum graminifolium C.Agardh, 1820
Sargassum granuliferum C.Agardh, 1820
Sargassum guangdongii Tseng & Lu, 1994

H

Sargassum hainanense Tseng & Lu, 1995
Sargassum hemiphylloides Kützing, 1847
Sargassum hemiphyllum (Turner) C.Agardh, 1820
Sargassum henslowianum C.Agardh, 1848
Sargassum herbaceum Kützing, 1849
Sargassum herklotsii Setchell, 1933
Sargassum herporhizum Setchell & N.L.Gardner, 1924
Sargassum hildebrandtii Grunow, 1889
Sargassum hombronianum Montagne, 1845
Sargassum horneri (Turner) C.Agardh, 1820
Sargassum hornschuchii C.Agardh, 1820
Sargassum horridulum Grunow, 1874
Sargassum horridum Setchell & N.L.Gardner, 1924
Sargassum howellii Setchell, 1937
Sargassum huangluense C.K.Tseng & Lu, 1996
Sargassum hystrix J.Agardh, 1847
Sargassum heterophyllum C.Agardh, 1820

I

Sargassum ilicifolioides Tseng & Lu, 2002
Sargassum ilicifolium (Turner) C.Agardh, 1820
Sargassum incanum Grunow, 1915
Sargassum incisifolium (Turner) C.Agardh, 1820
Sargassum integerrimum Tseng & Lu, 2002
Sargassum integrifolioides Tseng & Lu, 2000
Sargassum intermedium Tseng & Lu, 1996
Sargassum involucratum De Notaris, 1842

J

Sargassum johnsonii V.J.Chapman, 1961
Sargassum johnstonii Setchell & N.L.Gardner, 1924

K

Sargassum kashiwajimanum Yendo, 1907
Sargassum kasyotense Yamada, 1944
Sargassum kuetzingii Setchell, 1931
Sargassum kushimotense Yendo, 1907

L

Sargassum lacerifolium (Turner) C.Agardh, 1820
Sargassum laevigatum J.Agardh, 1889
Sargassum lanceolatum J.Agardh, 1848
Sargassum lapazeanum Setchell & N.L.Gardner, 1924
Sargassum latifolium (Turner) C.Agardh, 1820
Sargassum laxifolium Tseng & Lu, 1987
Sargassum leizhouense Tseng & Lu, 1994
Sargassum lendigerum (Linnaeus) C.Agardh, 1820
Sargassum leptopodum J.Agardh, 1889
Sargassum leptopodum Sonder, 1871
Sargassum liebmannii J.Agardh, 1847
Sargassum ligulatum C.Agardh, 1824
Sargassum linearifolium (Turner) C.Agardh, 1820
Sargassum longicarpum Tseng & Lu, 2004
Sargassum longicaulis Tseng & Lu, 1994
Sargassum longifolius
Sargassum longifructum C.K.Tseng & B.Lu, 1987
Sargassum longivesiculosum Tseng & Lu, 1998
Sargassum lophocarpum J.Agardh, 1889

M

Sargassum macdougalii E.Y.Dawson, 1944
Sargassum macrocarpum C.Agardh, 1820
Sargassum macrophyllum Zanardini, 1874
Sargassum marcaccii Grunow, 1884
Sargassum marginatum (C.Agardh) J.Agardh, 1848
Sargassum mathiesonii Kilar, 1992
Sargassum mcclurei Setchell, 1933
Sargassum megalocystum Tseng & Lu, 1997
Sargassum micracanthum (Kützing) Endlicher, 1843
Sargassum microceratium (Mertens ex Turner) C.Agardh, 1820
Sargassum microcystum J.Agardh, 1848
Sargassum microphyllum C.Agardh, 1820
Sargassum minimum Tseng & Lu, 2004
Sargassum miyabei Yendo, 1907
Sargassum muticum (Yendo) Fensholt, 1955

N

Sargassum namoense Nguyen Huu Dai, 2004
Sargassum nanshaense C.K.Tseng & Lu, 1996
Sargassum naozhounse C.K.Tseng & Lu, 1987
Sargassum natans (Linnaeus) Gaillon, 1828
Sargassum neglectum Figari & De Notaris, 1853
Sargassum neurophorum J.Agardh, 1889
Sargassum nigrescens Zanardini, 1858
Sargassum nigrifolioides C.K.Tseng & Lu, 1985
Sargassum nigrifolium Yendo, 1907
Sargassum nipponicum Yendo, 1907
Sargassum notarisii Zanardini, 1858
Sargassum novae-hollandiae P.C.Silva, 1996
Sargassum nozhouense Tseng & Lu, 1987

O

Sargassum obtusifolium J.Agardh, 1848
Sargassum ohnoi G.C.Trono, 1994
Sargassum okamurae Yoshida & T.Konno, 1983
Sargassum oligocystum Montagne, 1845
Sargassum orotavicum T.Díaz-Villa, J.Afonso-Carillo & M.Sansón, 2004

P

Sargassum pachycarpum J.Agardh, 1889
Sargassum pacificum Bory de Saint-Vincent, 1828
Sargassum pallidum (Turner) C.Agardh, 1820
Sargassum palmeri Grunow, 1915
Sargassum paniculatum J.Agardh, 1848
Sargassum paradoxum (R.Brown ex Turner) Gaillon, 1828
Sargassum parvifolioides Tseng & Lu, 2002
Sargassum parvifolium (Turner) C.Agardh, 1820
Sargassum parvivesiculosum C.K.Tseng & Lu, 1979
Sargassum parvulum Tseng & Lu, 2004
Sargassum patens C.Agardh, 1820
Sargassum persicum Kützing, 1849
Sargassum pfeifferae Grunow, 1874
Sargassum phamhoangii Nguyen Huu Dai, 2002
Sargassum philippinense Grunow, 1916
Sargassum phyllocystum C.K.Tseng & Lu, 1979
Sargassum picconii Grunow, 1889
Sargassum piluliferum (Turner) C.Agardh, 1820
Sargassum pinnatifidum Harvey, 1860
Sargassum pinnatiphyllum Kraft, 2009
Sargassum plagiophyllum C.Agardh, 1824
Sargassum platycarpum Montagne, 1842
Sargassum podacanthoides Kraft, 2009
Sargassum podacanthum Sonder, 1845
Sargassum polyacanthum J.Agardh, 1889
Sargassum polyceratium Montagne, 1837
Sargassum polycystum C.Agardh, 1824
Sargassum polyphyllum J.Agardh, 1848
Sargassum polyporum Montagne, 1842
Sargassum portierianum Zanardini, 1858
Sargassum primitivum Tseng & Lu, 1995
Sargassum prismaticum V.D.Chauhan, 1965
Sargassum pseudocystocarpum Grunow, 1886
Sargassum pseudolanceolatum Tseng & Lu, 2002
Sargassum pterocystum Zanardini, 1858
Sargassum pteropleuron Grunow, 1868
Sargassum pulchellum Grunow, 1888
Sargassum pumilum Tseng & Lu, 2000
Sargassum pusillum W.R.Taylor, 1975
Sargassum pyriforme C.Agardh, 1824

Q

Sargassum qingdaoense C.K.Tseng & B.Lu, 2000
Sargassum qinzhounse C.K.Tseng & B.Lu, 1994
Sargassum qionghaiense Tseng & Lu, 1996
Sargassum quinhonense Nguyen Huu Dai, 2002

R

Sargassum ramentaceum Zarmouth & Nizamuddin, 1991
Sargassum ramifolium Kützing, 1861
Sargassum raoulii J.D.Hooker & Harvey, 1845
Sargassum rhizophorum Tseng & Lu, 2002
Sargassum ringgoldianum Harvey, 1860
Sargassum robillardii (Grunow) Mattio, Zubia, Loveday, Crochelet, Duong, Payri, Bhagooli & Bolton, 2013
Sargassum robustum Kuntze, 1880
Sargassum rostratum J.Agardh, 1896
Sargassum ryukyuense Shimabukuro & Yoshida, 2008

S

Sargassum sagamianum Yendo, 1907
Sargassum salicifolioides Yamada, 1942
Sargassum salicifolium (J.Agardh) J.Agardh, 1889
Sargassum salicifolium Naccari, 1828
Sargassum saltii (Turner) C.Agardh, 1824
Sargassum samarense G.C.Trono, Jr, 1994
Sargassum sanyaense Tseng & Lu, 1997
Sargassum saundersii Kraft, 2009
Sargassum scabridum J.D.Hooker & Harvey, 1845
Sargassum scherzerianum Grunow, 1868
Sargassum schnetteri (Bula-Meyer) Camacho, Mattio & Diaz-Pulido, 2014
Sargassum scopula Grunow, 1916
Sargassum segii Yoshida, 1976
Sargassum serratifolium (C.Agardh) C.Agardh, 1820
Sargassum serratum Nguyen Huu Dai, 2004
Sargassum shandongense C.K.Tseng, Z.F.Zhang & B.Lu, 2000
Sargassum shangchuanii Tseng & Lu, 1994
Sargassum siliculosoides Tseng & Lu, 2002
Sargassum siliquastrum (Mertens ex Turner) C.Agardh, 1820
Sargassum siliquosum J.Agardh, 1848
Sargassum silvae C.K.Tseng & Lu Baoren, 1999
Sargassum silvai Tseng & Lu, 1999
Sargassum sinclairii J.D.Hooker & Harvey, 1845
Sargassum sinicola Setchell & N.L.Gardner, 1924
Sargassum sonorense E.Y.Dawson, 1960
Sargassum spathulophyllum J.Tanaka, H.Murakami & S.Arai, 1999
Sargassum spinifex C.Agardh, 1820
Sargassum spinuligerum Sonder, 1845
Sargassum squarrosum Greville, 1849
Sargassum steinitzii Lipkin & P.C.Silva, 2002
Sargassum subdroserifolium Tseng & Lu, 2002
Sargassum subfalcatum Sonder, 1854
Sargassum subrepandum (Forsskål) C.Agardh, 1820
Sargassum subspathulatum (Grunow) Grunow, 1916
Sargassum subtilissimum C.K.Tseng & Lu, 1978
Sargassum sullivanii G.C.Trono, 1994
Sargassum swartzii C.Agardh, 1820
Sargassum symphyorhizoideum Tseng & Lu, 2002

T

Sargassum taeniatum Kuntze, 1880
Sargassum taiwanicum C.KTseng & B.Lu, 1999
Sargassum telephifolium (Turner) C.Agardh, 1820
Sargassum templetonii Setchell, 1937
Sargassum tenerrimum J.Agardh, 1848
Sargassum tenuifolioides Tseng & Lu, 2002
Sargassum tenuifolium Yamada, 1942
Sargassum tenuissimum (Endlicher & Diesling) Grunow, 1915
Sargassum teretifolium J.Agardh, 1848
Sargassum thivyae V.Krishnamurthy & R.Ezhili, 2000
Sargassum thunbergii (Mertens ex Roth) Kuntze, 1880
Sargassum tilesii Grunow, 1916
Sargassum torvum J.Agardh, 1889
Sargassum tosaense Yendo, 1907
Sargassum trichocarpum J.Agardh, 1889
Sargassum tristichum Sonder, 1845
Sargassum turbinarioides Grunow, 1915

U

Sargassum ulixei G.Andrade-Sorcia & S.M.Boo, 2014
Sargassum umezakii G.C.Trono, 1994

V

Sargassum vachellianum Greville, 1848
Sargassum vaysierianum Montagne, 1850
Sargassum velasquezii G.C.Trono, 1992
Sargassum verrucosum Zanardini, 1858
Sargassum vestitum (R.Brown ex Turner) C.Agardh, 1820
Sargassum vigorosum P.C.Silva, 1996
Sargassum virescens Figari & De Notaris, 1853
Sargassum virgatum C.Agardh, 1820
Sargassum vizcainense E.Y.Dawson, 1954
Sargassum vulgare C.Agardh, 1820

W

Sargassum wakayamaense Yoshida, 1994
Sargassum wangii C.K.Tseng & Lu Baoren, 1998
Sargassum weizhounse C.K.Tseng & Lu, 2002
Sargassum wenchangense Tseng & Lu, 1995
Sargassum wsizhouense Tseng & Lu, 2002

X
Sargassum xishaense C.K.Tseng & Lu, 1979

Y

Sargassum yamadae Yoshida & T.Konno, 1983
Sargassum yamamotoi Yoshida, 1983
Sargassum yemenense
Sargassum yendoi Okamura & Yamada, 1938
Sargassum yezoense (Yamada) Yoshida & T.Konno, 1983
Sargassum yinggehaiense Tseng & Lu, 2002
Sargassum yongxingense Tseng & Lu, 1997
Sargassum yoshidae G.C.Trono, 1994

Z

Sargassum zacae Setchell, 1937
Sargassum zhangii C.K.Tseng & Lu Baoren, 1999

See also 
 List of brown algal genera

References 

Sargassum, List
Sargassum